Mad'an (ميداس) was a slave of Muhammad mentioned in the Hadith. 

He was an African slave given to Muhummad in 628AD by a man called Rifa'ah bin Zaid, from the Banu Ad-Dubaib.

Mad'an was shot by an arrow in a place called Wadi al-Qura (Wadi al-'Ula), 360km north of Medina, for stealing a cloak from the spoils of war at the Battle of Khaybar.

References

History of Islam
Islam and slavery
Medieval slaves
Arabian slaves and freedmen